Secret Avengers is an American comic book series published by Marvel Comics featuring a fictional black ops superhero team of the same name. The series started with Ed Brubaker on writing duties, depicting a black-ops sect of Marvel's premier super hero team, the Avengers, which operates under the guidance and leadership of Captain Steve Rogers (the former Captain America). The series is part of the Avengers-line relaunch as part of the "Heroic Age".

Publication history
Writer Ed Brubaker and artist Mike Deodato were announced as the creative team for the Secret Avengers title. A series of teaser images were released by Marvel to promote the upcoming series in February 2010, which slowly revealed the team's roster over the course of two months. The series started in late May 2010 (cover date July 2010).

As of the first issue, the roster includes Beast, War Machine, Valkyrie, Moon Knight, Nova, Black Widow, Sharon Carter and Ant-Man and the team is led by Captain Steve Rogers. In regards to the tone of the new title, Brubaker has said:

After Brubaker left the title, author Nick Spencer wrote the first Secret Avengers "Point One" issue (#12.1) and three Fear Itself tie-in one-shots. Secret Avengers was then written by Warren Ellis from issues #16-21 and scribe Rick Remender picked up at #21.1 with former Hulk artist, Gabriel Hardman. Remender confirmed that his final issue of Secret Avengers will be with issue #37.

At New York ComiCon 2012 it was announced that the title would be relaunched as part of the Marvel NOW! initiative, with Nick Spencer returning as writer. Spencer said, "This really is a S.H.I.E.L.D. book. I think it's something we've been long suffering for and is long overdue. This gave us a nice excuse to get a proper S.H.I.E.L.D. comic going. This Avengers initiative within S.H.I.E.L.D. is obviously a big focal point of the book, but it still is a S.H.I.E.L.D initiative so everything originates there. So Nick Fury and Agent Coulson are very much involved in the missions. Nick will be in the field with the team. That's his role. He's the S.H.I.E.L.D agent that goes with these characters on the missions. Coulson has a fun role in that he's backup and support. He's the guy who makes the pitch, and brings in the team. So they're a big part of every issue and in some ways they're even our leads.

The third volume was cancelled with #15 in April, 2015.

History

Volume 1
After the events of "Dark Reign" and Siege, Norman Osborn was deposed as America's "top cop" and his organization H.A.M.M.E.R. was disbanded. In response to his hand in reforming the original Avengers and staving off the Siege of Asgard, The President appointed former Captain America Steve Rogers as America's new foremost law enforcement agent, as well as dissolving the Superhuman Registration Act at Rogers' request. Captain Rogers then forms the Secret Avengers as a group of superheroes to operate under a veil of secrecy, in addition to the main Avengers team.

The opening issues show the team being proactive about known threats and cleaning them up, black ops style. They are in direct opposition to a group called the "Shadow Council" seemingly led by Nick Fury. In one such plot they find a dangerous artifact, the "Tentacle Crown". After some research the group finds a link to the Roxxon Corporation, which leads to investigations of a mining site on Mars. Richard Rider is on the case, and in his investigations he finds another crown, the "Serpent Crown." The crown possesses Nova, but he is pursued by a guardian of the crown claiming to be a collective named the "Archon" who was created by the Watchers. The possessed Nova directs Shadow Council agents into unearthing a primordial evil. Steve Rogers, with the help of the Xandarian Worldmind, temporarily gains the Nova Force to take out the Serpent Crown/Nova.

The Secret Avengers later have to deal with the fact that someone resembling Nick Fury is shown to be working for the Shadow Council. The real Fury confirms that what they are seeing is a self aware LMD modified by Jake Fury. S.H.I.E.L.D. was going to destroy the LMD, but he was rescued by the Shadow Council and given the name Max. Some other operatives in the "Shadow Council" are an immortal named Aloysius Thorndrake and former Golden Age hero John Steele.

Shang-Chi offers himself as bait in order to capture his immortal father, Zheng Zu, who needs the blood of a relative to stay alive. Ant-Man accidentally foils that plan, but later the team falls into a trap where Carter is kidnapped. Shang-chi volunteers to exchange himself for her, but during the exchange Moon Knight disguises himself as a Shadow Council guard. He is able to lead the team to stop the sacrificial ceremony. John Steele is apprehended and Captain America is able to delve into his memories and figures out that because of his actions during a WW2 mission, John Steele ended up getting kidnapped and brain washed by the Shadow Council.

During the Fear Itself Crossover, the Secret Avengers are summoned to defend Washington DC. Beast meets with an old congressman friend, who turns out to be an Omega-level mutant, who can animate statues, then has Abraham Lincoln from the Lincoln Memorial and dinosaurs from the National Museum of Natural History fight off Nazis. In issue 14 we get Valkyrie's origin story, about how she defended her love during a battle and Odin made her an immortal. She then leads a groups of soldiers in battle.

The Secret Avengers then track the Shadow Council to an underground city, to Serbia to stop a soul-stealing truck, to a multiverse, a fictional Eastern European arms dealer who has demonic super-soldier serum, and an alien hybrid breeding lab

During one battle the team gets killed, but Black Widow is able to teleport back in time. In order to save her team, but not disrupt the time continuum, she teleports back 44 years and creates the technology needed to stop the lasers that kill her team without them realizing she saved them.

Max Fury and the Shadow Council form their incarnation of the Masters of Evil where its membership consists of Princess Python II, Vengeance II, and Whiplash IV. The Secret Avengers discover them during a mission run by Captain America, who is testing Hawkeye's leadership skills before making him the new team leader.

Giant-Man, Captain Britain, and the original Human Torch join the Secret Avengers with investigating a new threat called the Descendants, an army of synthezoids. During the battle it seems that Ant-Man is killed and Torch is severely damaged, but Agent Venom rescues the team. Ant-Man reappears uninjured.

The team then crosses over into the Avengers vs. X-Men event. They attempt to intercept the Phoenix Force, but fail to stop it, even with Thor's help. They land in Kree home world Hala, but Protector and Carol Danvers are subdued by the Kree Hive-mind, which is being manipulated into inviting the Phoenix Force, which is heading for Hala since Mar-Vell adsorbed some of the force during a reincarnation ceremony. Vision is able to break the control and Mar-Vell sacrifices himself into the Phoenix, then it spares Hala.

The Masters of Evil realize John Steele is a double agent, but are able to keep the mystic crowns and even steal the third from Taskmaster, then unleash an evil force called The Abyss on Bagalia, that controls the minds of the Masters and the Avengers. Venom and Ant-Man were immune and are able to separate the three crowns. Black Widow suspects that Ant-Man is a LMD, since he wasn't affected by The Abyss, but her suspicions are dismissed by Hawkeye due to Grady's heroic actions, causing her to quit in protest.

The Descendants (with the addition of the Human Torch who was reprogrammed to serve them) launched a massive attack on the main cities of the world, starting an invasion to take it and launched a nano-mist, which slowly started turning every human into Descendants. The Secret Avengers fought them, and Human Torch {who Captain Britain made come into his senses} managed to destroy the Orb of Necromancy, which killed every single one of the Descendants of the High-Breed and eliminated the nano-mist from any human. Before dying, the Father told Captain Britain he still felt the presence of another Descendant who didn't die. In the aftermath, the Secret Avengers reunited with Captain America to tell him what happened. Time later, Hawkeye decided to disassemble the unit.

Volume 2
As part of the Marvel NOW! event, a new version of the Secret Avengers is formed under the jurisdiction of S.H.I.E.L.D. A mysterious traveler from the future attacks a battalion of S.H.I.E.L.D. agents before he is killed. Following the attack, Maria Hill decides to form S.H.I.E.L.D.'s version of the Secret Avengers. Maria Hill is able to recruit Hawkeye, Black Widow, Nick Fury Jr., and Phil Coulson. Their first operation is to foil a plan of the terrorist group Al-Qaeda from using teleportation knowledge given by Andras Bertesy to execute a terrorist attack on the United States. The Secret Avengers follow the terrorist group to Budapest, where they get the coordinates of the attack from one of their members. After Hawkeye is left to be rescued by Black Widow, Nick Fury Jr. sets a trap for the Al-Qaeda member who was going to perform the attack, by waiting him in the Oval Office to kill him.

In the second mission, the Secret Avengers raid Bagalia and fight through the Masters of Evil, in order to free Taskmaster, who is going to be auctioned off to the highest bidder. Mockingbird joins up with them, using S.H.I.E.L.D. Camo-Tech to masquerade as Aloysius Thorndrake of the Shadow Council. Nick Fury Jr. pays Crossfire to let Taskmaster out of his cell. After Taskmaster agrees to join the Secret Avengers, he goes on a mission to infiltrate A.I.M.'s new High Council (consisting of Andrew Forson, Graviton, Jude the Entropic Man, Mentallo, Superia, and Yelena Belova).

When Daisy Johnson and Nick Fury Jr. were attending the weapons expo, they meet up with Senator Robert Ralston. Daisy notices that one of the items at the expo is the Iron Patriot armor. A.I.M. then attacks the weapons expo which leads to the supposed death of Senator Robert Ralston during A.I.M.'s fight with the Secret Avengers. During the fight, Andrew Forson takes the opportunity to steal the Iron Patriot armor.

Director Daisy Johnson gave Nick Fury, Hawkeye, and Black Widow the Protocol D which is the assassination of the A.I.M. Scientist Supreme. Hulk was recruited to help with the mission when A.I.M. duplicates the technology of the Iron Patriot Armor to create an army of sentient drones that A.I.M. would use to incriminate the United States in numerous international attacks. Hulk was able to destroy the Iron Patriot drones that were attacking Iran. Meanwhile, Phil Coulson talks to War Machine about the Iron Patriot armor.

The Secret Avengers raided A.I.M. Island and seemingly killed Andrew Forson. Daisy Johnson ended up suspended for breaking protocol and Maria Hill is put in charge of S.H.I.E.L.D. again. As Andrew Forson was revealed to be alive all along, the news of A.I.M. being a new permanent member of the Security Council is known.

Using holographic communication, S.H.I.E.L.D. hacked into A.I.M.'s network and allowed Rhodes to talk to the suits, who recognized him as "the Pilot", along Tony Stark being "the Maker". Rhodey managed to make the Iron Patriot army understand their actions of abruptly attacking tactical points of enemies of the US was unacceptable, and stated he could teach them better if he could show them, for what the androids sent Rhodes a different version of Iron Patriot armor.

MODOK Superior and some rogue A.I.M. Agents allied with S.H.I.E.L.D. in order to make a deal to take down Andrew Forson.

After the mission goes south and Mockingbird is left stranded on A.I.M. Island, Taskmaster works undercover to free her. But when he gets the chance to get her off the island, she doesn't respond to anything he says until both are captured. Later while being interrogated, Taskmaster is shot and seemingly killed by Mockingbird who is now under the control of Andrew Forsen.

Andrew Forson revealed that Mockingbird was secretly working for Forson years ago, and that he used Mockingbird to "get Victorius out of the way" so that he could take over the Cult of Entropy.

Volume 3
In the All-New Marvel NOW!, a new Secret Avengers team was assembled consisting of Nick Fury Jr., Black Widow, Phil Coulson, and Spider-Woman. Hawkeye rejoins the team, sometime later. The series was cancelled in 2015, after 15 issues.

Roster

Original Team (2010-2013)

Shattered Heroes recruits

Marvel NOW! recruits
Following the Avengers vs. X-Men storyline and the fight against the Descendants, S.H.I.E.L.D. takes direct control of the Secret Avengers' operations.

All-New Marvel NOW! recruits

Honorary
These characters temporary joined the team to help on that particular mission.

Collected editions

In other media

Television
The Secret Avengers appear in Avengers Assemble. In the episode "Avengers Disassembled", Captain America leaves the Avengers, joins S.H.I.E.L.D., and forms the Secret Avengers with Black Widow, the Falcon, and the Hulk. In their self-titled episode, the Secret Avengers are charged with recovering a power source from HYDRA, though they inadvertently clash with the Winter Guard before discovering the power source in question is the Radioactive Man. In the following episode "The Ultron Outbreak", the Secret Avengers rejoin the original Avengers to defeat Ultron.

Film
The Secret Avengers serve as inspiration for films set in the Marvel Cinematic Universe (MCU):
 In Captain America: The Winter Soldier (2014), Captain America wears a suit based on the "Super Soldier" suit worn by Steve Rogers in Secret Avengers Vol. 1.
 While not directly referred to as such in Avengers: Infinity War (2018), Captain America, Black Widow, Wanda Maximoff, and the Falcon are depicted as an independent group following their separation from the Avengers in the preceding film Captain America: Civil War. Co-director Joe Russo confirmed on the audio commentary for Infinity War that this team is the MCU incarnation of the Secret Avengers.

Video games
 Captain America's "Super Soldier" suit from Secret Avengers Vol. 1 appears as a DLC costume for Captain America in Marvel vs. Capcom 3: Fate of Two Worlds.
 Captain America's "Super Soldier" suit from Secret Avengers Vol. 1 appears as an unlockable costume for Captain America in Marvel's Avengers.

References

External links
 Secret Avengers (Black Ops version) at Marvel Wiki
 Secret Avengers (S.H.I.E.L.D. version) at Marvel Wiki
 Secret Avengers at Marvel.com

Reviews

 Secret Avengers #1 Review, Comic Book Resources

Comics by Ed Brubaker
Avengers (comics) titles
Comics set in Serbia